JODX-DTV, virtual channel 8 (UHF digital channel 17), branded as  or , is the Kansai region key station of the Fuji News Network (FNN) and Fuji Network System (FNS), operated by the . Kansai TV is a company affiliated in Hankyu Hanshin Holdings Group of Hankyu Hanshin Toho Group.

Offices
the headquarters – 1-7, Ogimachi Nichome, Kita-ku, Osaka, Japan
Tokyo Branch Office – Jiji Press Building, 15-8, Ginza Gochome, Chūō, Tokyo, Japan
Nagoya Branch Station – Telepia, 14-25, Higashi-Sakura Itchome, Higashi-ku, Nagoya, Japan

Advertising slogan
April, 1975: Stay tune, Channel 8. (チャンネルそのまま8チャンネル, Because Asahi Broadcasting Corporation (ABC) and Mainichi Broadcasting System, Inc. (MBS) were exchanged; more details on the exchange in its own articles.)
1994: Dash
1995 – March, 1997: Peechiku-Park Station (ピーチクパークステーション, Hachiemon, the mascot character of Kansai TV, was born.)
April, 1997–March 29, 2015 : Kante-le (カンテーレ)
March 30, 2015 – present : More than, Kantele (超えろ。カンテレ)

History of Kansai TV
February 1, 1958 – Dai Kansai TV Company (大関西テレビ放送株式会社) was founded.
July 5, 1958 – Dai Kansai TV was renamed "Kansai Telecasting Corporation", and started analog terrestrial telecasting on November 22.
1959 – Kansai TV formed a TV network with Fuji TV, Tokai TV and Kyushu Asahi Broadcasting
1964 – The affiliated station of the network in Fukuoka changed to TV Nishinippon.
1966 – Fuji News Network (FNN) was formed.
1970 – Fuji Network System (FNS) was formed.
1982 – Kansai TV hosted the first Osaka Women's Marathon.
1992 – Kansai TV opened Lemon Studio in Tokyo.
October 1, 1997 – Kansai TV moved the headquarters from Nishi-Temma, Kita-ku, Osaka to Ogimachi, Kita-ku, Osaka. While its old Nishi-Temma headquarters demolished in 2011 and now as a car parking lot.
December 1, 2003 – Kansai TV started digital terrestrial telecasting.
July 24, 2011 – Analog terrestrial telecasting ended.
March 30, 2015 – Kansai TV aborts its 51-year-old long-running abstract KTV-wordmark logo alongside its 8-symbol which ends their usage for the first time of 51 years since 1964, and by that, the station unifies its appellation as "Kantele (カンテレ)" as it adopts a new logo which consists of a purple 8 on a purple shadow and it is beside to the grey Kantale, so for now, its new logo will be stylized as "8 kantele (8 カンテレ)".

Broadcasting

Digital
JODX-DTV
Virtual:  8
Osaka (Mt. Ikoma) – Channel 17
Shiga Prefecture
Otsu, Hikone, Koka – Channel 17
Shigaraki – Channel 48
Kyōto Prefecture
Fukuchiyama, Maizuru, Miyazu, Mineyama, Kameoka – Channel 17
Yamashina – Channel 47
Osaka Prefecture
Kashiwara, Miksaki, Nose – Channel 17
Hyōgo Prefecture
Mt. Maya (Kobe), Himeji, Hokutan-Tarumi, Miki, Kasumi, Kinosaki, Tatsuno, Fukusaki, Nishiwaki, Sasayama, Hikami, Ako, Aioi, Kawanishi-Keyakizaka, Nantan – Channel 17
Inagawa – Channel 40
Ichijima – Channel 34
Yoka, Hidaka, Yamasaki – Channel 29
Nagata-ku, Myoho-ji – Channel 39
Kanzaki – Channel 44
Nara Prefecture
Tochihara – Channel 41
Wakayama Prefecture
Wakayama, Kinokawa, Kainan, Gobo, Kibi, Arida, Tanabe, Shimotsu, SHingu, Kushimoto – Channel 17
Hashimoto – Channel 44
Tanabe-kita, Minabegawa, Yura – Channel 48

Analog
as of the end of the broadcasting
JODX-TV
Osaka (Mt. Ikoma) and cities along Osaka Bay – Channel 8
Shiga Prefecture
Otsu – Channel 40
Shigaraki – Channel 37
Koka – Channel 59
Hikone – Channel 60
Kyoto Prefecture
Yamashina, Kyoto – Channel 58
Kameoka – Channel 37
Fukuchiyama – Channel 60
Maizuru – Channel 59
Osaka Prefecture
Hirakata – Channel 57
Kashiwara – Channel 58
Miksaki – Channel 58
Hyōgo Prefecture
Kobe – Channel 43
Himeji – Channel 60
Nishinomiya-Yamaguchi – Channel 59
Toyooka – Channel 60
Kasumi – Channel 37
Nara Prefecture
Ikoma-Asukano – Channel 39
Gojo – Channel 37
Yoshino – Channel 38
Wakayama Prefecture
Wakayama – Channel 46
Gobo – Channel 59
Kinokawa – Channel 59
Kainan – Channel 60
Hashimoto – Channel 29
Arida – Channel 39
Kushimoto – Channel 59
Shingu – Channel 40

Programs (Times in JST)

News
Every Sunday morning
KTV News (KTVニュース) – from 6:00 a.m. until 6:15 a.m.
Before noon
FNN Speak (FNNスピーク) – from 11:30 a.m. until noon on weekdays and from 11:45 a.m. until noon on Saturdays
KTV News (KTVニュース) –  from 11:50 a.m. until noon on Sundays
In the evening
FNN Supernews Anchor (FNNスーパーニュースアンカー) – from 4:54 p.m. until 7:00 p.m. on weekdays
FNN Supernews WEEKEND (FNNスーパーニュースWEEKEND) – from 5:30 p.m. until 6:00 p.m. every weekend
Before 9 p.m.
KTV News Pick Up – from 8:54 p.m. until 9:00 p.m. every day (Regularly news from Tokyo, sometimes news from Osaka)

Information
Gokigen Lifestyle Ready, Go! (ごきげんライフスタイル よ〜いドン!)
Hapi-kuru! (Happiness is on its way!) (ハピくるっ!)
Niji Iro Jean (にじいろジーン)
Momoko no Oh! Sore! Miyo! (モモコのOH!ソレ!み～よ!)
Mr. Sunday (Mr.サンデー) – collaboration with Fuji TV

Variety shows
SMAP×SMAP (read: smap smap) – collaboration with Fuji TV
Catherine (キャサリン) → Catherine III (キャサリン三世)(end)
Hiroiki Ariyoshi no Daretoku!? (有吉弘行のダレトク!?)
Takajin Mune Ippai (たかじん胸いっぱい)
Uramayo! (ウラマヨ!)
Samma no Mamma (さんまのまんま)
R-1 Grand Prix
Hakkutsu! Aru-aru Dai-Jiten → Hakkutsu! Aru-aru Dai-Jiten II (発掘!あるある大事典→発掘!あるある大事典II)(end)
Kaimono Seikatsu Nambo de Nambo? (買物生活ほんでなんぼ?) (end)
Gout Temps Series (グータンシリーズ) (end)

Dramas produced by Kansai TV
27 FNS stations　from 10 p.m. until 10:54 p.m. on Tuesdays
Current: 
See the Official website for the current TV drama.

In past (10 p.m. on Tuesdays)
Great Teacher Onizuka (GTO)
 (starring Ryoko Yonekura, shown on FNS stations including Fuji TV)

 (wholly produced by Kansai TV)

 (wholly produced by Kansai TV)

 (wholly produced by Kansai TV)

 (wholly produced by Kansai TV) – based on the manga "Real Clothes" by Satoru Makimura

 (wholly produced by Kansai TV) – based on the novel "Good Life" by Cho Chang-In

 (wholly produced by Kansai TV)
 (with MMJ)
and more...
Special

Sports
Professional Baseball Live  (プロ野球中継, the Hanshin Tigers and the Orix Buffaloes)
Osaka International Ladies Marathon (大阪国際女子マラソン, Hosted by Japan Association of Athletics Federations, Kansai TV, the Sankei Shimbun, Sankei Sports, Radio Osaka and Osaka City)
Keiba Beat (競馬BEAT)
Diamond Cup Golf

See also
Hankyu Hanshin Toho Group

References

Website

Fuji News Network
Companies based in Osaka Prefecture
Television stations in Japan
Television channels and stations established in 1958
Mass media in Osaka
Hankyu Hanshin Holdings
1958 establishments in Japan